Netpolitik is an emerging smart power type diplomacy that differs from realpolitik.  In 2002, the Aspen Institute convened a three-day conference in Aspen, Colorado to explore the meaning of netpolitik and how the internet is changing the powers of the nation-state, international relations, and national security.  From the report produced by this conference, as synthesized by David Bollier, “Netpolitik is a new style of diplomacy that seeks to exploit the powerful capabilities of the Internet to shape politics, culture, values, and personal identity.  But unlike Realpolitik—which seeks to advance a nation’s political interests through amoral coercion—Netpolitik traffics in ‘softer’ issues such as moral legitimacy, cultural identity, societal values, and public perception” (p. 2, 2002).  Netpolitik requires different resources than realpolitik, and is therefore different in its availability for use, bearing implications for the execution of diplomacy.  The emergence of netpolitik and its interaction with realpolitik are related but not limited to that of soft power, and its interaction with hard power.   

Netpolitik may overlap with other proposed ‘politiks,’ such as mediapolitik, cyberpolitik, and noopolitik, but its proponents argue that none of them is sufficient for dealing with issues of the 21st century, such as high technology and biological encroachment, and that only netpolitik embodies the network form as the organizing principle in the conduct of world affairs.

References

 Aspen Institute. How the Internet is changing International Politics and Diplomacy. 2002.

International relations
Internet-based activism